Rockaway is an unincorporated community in Seneca County, in the U.S. state of Ohio.

History
A post office called Rockaway was established in 1874, and remained in operation until 1910. The advent of Rural Free Delivery caused Rockaway's post office to be discontinued.

References

Unincorporated communities in Seneca County, Ohio
Unincorporated communities in Ohio